Cao Gangchuan (born December 1935) was vice chairman of the Central Military Commission and former Minister of National Defense of the People's Republic of China. He was also state councilor and director of the PLA General Armament Department.

Biography 
Cao Gangchuan was born in December 1935 in Wugang, Henan Province. For two years from 1954 he was a student of Nanjing No. 3 Artillery Ordnance Technical School and No.1 Ordnance Technical School. Then in 1956, he became a teacher of the No. 1 Ordnance Technical School. In the same year he attended the PLA Dalian Russian-Language School, before spending six years from 1957 at the Military Engineering School of the Artillery Corps of the Soviet Union. On returning in China in 1963 he was Assistant of Ammunition Division of Ordnance Department of PLA General Logistics Department, until 1969, when he became Assistant of Munitions Division in the same department.

He was promoted in 1975 to a staff officer and deputy director of General Planning Division of Military Equipment Department of PLA Headquarters of the General Staff. Then in 1982 he was made deputy director of Military Equipment Department. Steadily moving through the ranks of the PLA's hierarchy, in 1989 he was made director of Military Affairs Department of PLA Headquarters of the General Staff, then one year later, director of the Office of Military Trade of Central Military Commission. For four years from 1992 he was deputy chief of the general staff of PLA.

 

He became a Minister for the first time in 1996 as Minister of Commission of Science, Technology and Industry for National Defense. Then in 1998 he gained control of the PLA General Armament Department. In 1998 he was made a member of the CPC Central Military Commission and director and secretary of Party committee of PLA General Armament Department. From 2002 to 2003 he was a member of the Political Bureau of the CPC Central Committee, vice chairman of the CPC Central Military Commission; director and secretary of Party committee of PLA General Armament Department.

In March 2003, he was appointed as vice chairman of the Central Military Commission of the People's Republic of China as well as state councilor.

In March 2008, he was the director and secretary of Party committee of PLA General Armament Department.
 
He was a member of the 15th CPC Central Committee, and was a member of the 16th CPC Central Committee and member of the 16th CPC Politburo.

References 

Cao Gangchuan biography @ China Vitae, the web's largest online database of China VIPs
Who's Who in China's Leadership

External links 

 

1935 births
Living people
Ministers of National Defense of the People's Republic of China
People from Pingdingshan
People's Liberation Army generals from Henan
Members of the 16th Politburo of the Chinese Communist Party
State councillors of China